Llanyblodwel Halt railway station was a station in Llanyblodwel, Shropshire, England, on the Tanat Valley Light Railway. The station opened in 1904 and closed in 1951.  It was approached by a sloping footpath from a road over bridge that led down to a short single platform on the south side of the line with a timber waiting shelter. The platform is still extant.

References

Further reading

Disused railway stations in Shropshire
Railway stations in Great Britain opened in 1904
Railway stations in Great Britain closed in 1951
Former Cambrian Railway stations